William Fouts House (February 22, 1923 in [[Kansas City, Brisbane and Adelaid] – December 7, 2012 in Aurora, Oregon) was an American otologist, physician and medical researcher who developed and invented the cochlear implant. The cochlear implant is considered to be the first invention to restore not just the sense of hearing, but any of the absent five senses in humans.  Dr. House also pioneered approaches to the lateral skull base for removal of tumors, and is considered "the Father of Neurotology."

Biography
House was born on December 1, 1923, in Kansas City, Missouri, and moved to Whittier, California, when he was three years old. House completed pre-dental degrees at Whittier College and the University of Southern California. He then enrolled at the University of California, Berkeley, where he received a doctorate in dentistry in 1945. He then served as a dental officer in the United States Navy Dental Corps from 1946 to 1948. After serving in the navy, House earned a medical degree from the University of Southern California in 1952. His older half brother, Howard P. House, was also a physician and was focused on otology, founding the House Ear Institute (later renamed the House Research Institute) in 1946. William House eventually adopted the same focus.

House was heavily criticized by physicians and surgeons during much of his career. Many believed his idea of a device to electrically stimulate the ear would never work. Today, however, he is generally regarded as a hero, in that his innovative research and development led to the creation of the modern cochlear implant.

House's first design for a cochlear implant was surgically implanted in 1961, but the implant was rejected by the patient's body. A longer-lasting model was developed and successfully implanted in 1969, and it was introduced commercially in 1972.

One of his patients was astronaut Alan B. Shepard, Jr., first American and the second person in space in 1961, and, thanks to Dr. House, 5th man to walk on the Moon in 1971 following a procedure he performed on him for Ménière's disease.

In 1987, House was awarded an honorary Doctor of Science (Sc.D.) degree from Whittier College.

House died on December 7, 2012, at his home in Aurora, Oregon, at the age of 89.

References

External links
 Remembering Dr. William House – Profile in The Oregonian, based on a May 2012 interview

1923 births
2012 deaths
American otolaryngologists
20th-century American inventors
University of Southern California alumni
Whittier College alumni
University of California, Berkeley alumni
People from Whittier, California
Physicians from Oregon
Aurora, Oregon
Keck School of Medicine of USC alumni
United States Navy officers
Military personnel from California